United Nations Security Council resolution 1275, adopted unanimously on 19 November 1999, after recalling resolutions 1242 (1999) and 1266 (1999) concerning the Oil-for-Food Programme, the council, acting under Chapter VII of the United Nations Charter, extended provisions relating to the export of Iraqi petroleum or petroleum products in return for humanitarian aid for two weeks until 4 December 1999.

The security council had previously raised the limit on the value of oil that Iraq was allowed to export under the Programme, and the increased limit would be valid until 4 December. Though several members of the Council supported the adoption of Resolution 1275 to ensure the uninterrupted continuation of the Programme, they expressed concern that the council was unable to reach a consensus on how to approach the Iraq situation. Disagreements amongst the Council continued to affect the adoption of further resolutions on the Oil-for-Food Programme.

See also
 Foreign relations of Iraq
 Gulf War
 Invasion of Kuwait
 Iraq sanctions
 List of United Nations Security Council Resolutions 1201 to 1300 (1998–2000)

References

External links
 
Text of the Resolution at undocs.org

 1275
1999 in Iraq
 1275
November 1999 events